The East-West Corridor of the Ahmedabad Metro is the first metro line of the Ahmedabad city's mass rapid transit rail.

History 

The ground breaking ceremony was held on 14 March 2015 for the construction of 6.5 km long Vastral – Apparel Park stretch of East–West corridor of the Phase-1 in presence of then Gujarat Chief Minister, Anandiben Patel. The work started in March 2016. The trial runs were carried out on the section in February 2019. The section was inaugurated on 4 March 2019 by Indian Prime Minister Narendra Modi along with Chief Minister of Gujarat Vijay Rupani and Deputy Chief Minister Nitinbhai Patel. It opened to the public on 6 March 2019. The 1.4 km-long Thaltej-Thaltej Gam section and two metro stations, Thaltej Gam and Kankaria East, will be completed by January-March 2023. The rest of the Phase-1 was inaugurated on 30 September 2022 by Prime Minister Modi. The East-West corridor was opened to public on  2 October 2022. On next day, 17,000 people travelled on 44 trips.

Features 
While connecting Vastral Gam to Thaltej Gam, this line will be passing through Nirant Cross Road, Vastral, Rabari Colony, Amraiwadi, Apparel Park, Kankaria East, Kalupur Railway Station, Ghee Kanta, Shahpur, Old High Court, Stadium, Commerce Six Road, Gujarat University, Gurukul Road, Doordarshan Kendra and Thaltej stations.

The underground section is approximately 6.5 km in length with 4 underground stations, while the elevated section has 14 elevated stations. Old High Court station serves as an interchange station for the East-West corridor and North-South corridor.

The underground section is constructed about 22 metre deep at the lowest level near Gheekanta station. The other three underground stations are about 12-14 metres deep.

List of stations 
Following is a list of stations on this route:

Construction
The Gujarat Metro Rail Corporation (GMRC) Limited has divided the construction work of the 20.73 km long East-West Corridor of Ahmedabad Metro into multiple construction packages. 

The list of contractors is as follows:

References 

Ahmedabad Metro lines